Veroljub "Vero" Salatić (born 14 November 1985) is a Bosnian-born Swiss football coach and a former player who played as a central midfielder.

Career
A Bosnian Serb, Salatić moved to Switzerland as a child and started training with local team SC Zug in 1992, aged 7. In 2000, he moved on to Grasshopper Club Zürich. In the 2003–04 season he broke into the first team. He is used mostly as a holding midfielder or as a central defender.

AC Omonia
In July 2011, he signed a contract with Cypriot side AC Omonia.

Ufa
On 31 August 2017, Salatić signed for Russian Premier League side FC Ufa. He left Ufa on 3 June 2019 upon the expiration of his contract.

Return to Grasshoppers
On 17 June 2019, he returned to Grasshoppers for the second time, signing a 2-year contract. The contract was terminated by the club on 11 August 2020, and he retired from playing.

International career
Salatić has represented Switzerland at various levels including at the U-19 European Championship in 2004 in Switzerland. In 2005, he starred at the FIFA U-20 World Cup. The side were managed by Pierre-André Schürmann. Salatić starred alongside a Swiss team including Blerim Džemaili, Tranquillo Barnetta and Valon Behrami.

His success has not gone unnoticed by the Football Association of Serbia who have twice attempted to call him up, both times he refused saying he wished to play for Switzerland. He played his last match for the U21 side against England in 2006 and since then neither Köbi Kuhn or Ottmar Hitzfeld have shown any interest in calling him up.

As an ethnic Serb from Bosnia, he first expressed his desire to play for Serbia but he was never called, so he later stated that he would like to play for national team of Bosnia and Herzegovina.

Honours

Club
Grasshopper Zurich
Swiss Cup: 2012–13
AC Omonia
Cypriot Cup: 2011-12
FC Sion 
Swiss Cup: 2014-15

Career statistics

Club

Notes

References

External links
Profile at GCZ.CH 
Vero Salatic at soccerbase.com 

Living people
1985 births
Bosnia and Herzegovina emigrants to Switzerland
Serbs of Bosnia and Herzegovina
Swiss people of Serbian descent
People from Zvornik
Swiss men's footballers
Swiss expatriate footballers
Switzerland under-21 international footballers
Switzerland youth international footballers
Swiss Super League players
Grasshopper Club Zürich players
Cypriot First Division players
Russian Premier League players
AC Omonia players
FC Sion players
FC Ufa players
Association football midfielders
Expatriate footballers in Cyprus
Expatriate footballers in Russia
Swiss expatriate sportspeople in Russia
Swiss football managers